Leonard Marshall Smith (December 14, 1896 – April 14, 1944) was a player in the National Football League. He played two seasons with the Racine Legion.

References

Sportspeople from Oshkosh, Wisconsin
Players of American football from Wisconsin
Racine Legion players
Wisconsin Badgers football players
1896 births
1944 deaths